Me and Mr. Johnson is the fifteenth solo studio album recorded by Eric Clapton. It consists of covers of songs written and originally recorded by Robert Johnson. Released in March 2004 by Reprise Records, with the cover painted by Sir Peter Blake, using a series of photographs of Clapton. Clapton had planned to record an album of new material, but by the time of the recording sessions there were not enough new songs written, so the band instead recorded a series of Johnson songs.

Me and Mr. Johnson sold more than two million albums worldwide and reached the Top 10 in more than 15 countries. A companion album and video release entitled Sessions for Robert J was released on 7 December 2004, and featured different versions of each of the songs from the studio album.

Background
In the beginning of 2004, Clapton set out to record a new album, working with his long-time collaborator Simon Climie on several songs that Clapton wrote about love, peace and happiness. However, when it came time to record in the studio, there were not enough finished songs for an album, so Clapton suggested the band play some songs composed by Delta blues great Robert Johnson. In just two weeks, Clapton and his studio band, Andy Fairweather Low, Billy Preston, Steve Gadd, Doyle Bramhall II, and Nathan East recorded an entire album consisting of Johnson cover songs. Clapton was very pleased with the recordings, as was Warner Bros. Records and Reprise Records manager Tom Whalley. Clapton eventually finished his original material, which was released on the album Back Home in 2005.

In February 2004, Clapton was interviewed about his new studio album:

Critical reception

AllMusic critic Stephen Thomas Erlewine notes Clapton sounds very "comfortable and relaxed" on the studio album "as if he was having fun making music". Erlewine calls the album "simply the most enjoyable record he's made" since From the Cradle with the possible exception of Riding with the King. Comparing the album to Clapton's older Blues albums, the music critic notes: "in some respects it's a better blues album than [these other ones] since it never sounds as doggedly serious as that guitar–heavy affair". Erlewine finishes his review liking the whole concept and production of the album: "Some might take issue with this, and others may find the album too slickly produced – admittedly, blues albums should never boast a credit for Pro Tools, as this does – but this is a heartfelt tribute that's among Clapton's most purely enjoyable albums". He awarded the release three and a half out of five possible stars. Rolling Stone critic David Fricke felt that "Clapton takes different routes back to blues school on this cover album, but does it so with mutual fealty and honest delight". Some of the songs, says Fricke, have "a blistering chorus or two" in them, "to better show off the dirty–rubber swing of Clapton's longtime road and studio band". The journalist finishes his review, finding "Clapton pays broad tribute to Johnson as a composer and public-domain synthesist". The British Uncut magazine liked the background work of Clapton's studio band, as they seem to be an "authentic, bottomless thump" to the Johnson tunes and leave Clapton enough space to play "devastating" guitar and sing "like a man who has faced down more than a few canine devils of his own". The magazine awarded the release four out of five points.

Journalist Edna Gundersen from USA Today calls the 2004 studio album a "homage to the genre's godfather in 14 electric versions of acoustic blueprints that laid the groundwork for the '60s rock explosion" and rates the album with three and a half out of four possible stars, calling the songs "greasy as they are graceful, conveying an earthy intensity". Critic Robert Gauthier from Entertainment Weekly opined that Me and Mr. Johnson "will likely become a coffee-table album" and notes "Clapton sounds reinvigorated in these 14 songs by "Crossroads" soul–salesman Robert Johnson, with phlegm in his throat and (relative) fire in his belly". He also liked Billy Preston's work on keyboards and awarded the release a "B+" rating, meaning "very good". Rob Webb from BBC Music feels that: "Clapton is no longer God: he now plays the Devil. For him to take on Johnson's catalogue makes perfect sense. With both wailing electric guitar and acoustic–slide under his arm, Eric runs through 'When You Got a Good Friend', 'Milkcow's Calf Blues', 'Come On In My Kitchen' and a dozen other tried and tested Johnson tunes. They are all delivered with sincerity, love and respect. The band are as tight as a bottle-stop, the recording is as clear as a bell and Clapton's singing and playing sound just fine. Me and Mr Johnson will appeal to his AOR audience after a bit of authentic as much as it will to staunch blues fans hungry for digital-age renditions of Johnson standards". Billboard critic Christopher Walsh thinks that on Me and Mr. Johnson "Clapton is in fine form, setting aside the slick instrumentation and production that have marked much of his more recent work in favor of a smaller ensemble", creating as the result "a sparse sound, allowing Clapton's usual outstanding lead and slide guitar work to shine. Clapton and the stellar musicians behind him are obviously passionate about the music". Although Walsh liked the music on the album, he would like Clapton to "let it loose" more.

Track listing

Personnel
 Eric Claptonguitar, slide guitar, vocals
 Andy Fairweather Lowguitar
 Doyle Bramhall IIguitar, slide guitar
 Billy Prestonacoustic piano, Hammond organ
 Nathan Eastbass guitar (1-4, 6-14)
 Pino Palladinobass guitar (5)
 Steve Gadddrums (1-4, 6-14)
 Jim Keltnerdrums (5)
 Jerry Portnoyharmonica

Production
 Producers – Eric Clapton and Simon Climie
 Recording Engineer – Alan Douglas
 Second Assistant Engineer – Bea Henkel
 Assistant Engineers – Philippe Rose and Tom Stanley
 Mixed by Mick Guzauski
 Mix Assistant – Tom Bender.
 Pro Tools Engineer – Simon Climie
 Additional Pro Tools – Joel Evenden and Jonathan Shakhovsky
 Mastered by Bob Ludwig at Gateway Mastering (Portland, ME).
 Guitar Technician – Lee Dickson
 Project Coordinator – Mick Double
 Album Cover Concept and Liner Notes – Eric Clapton 
 Cover Illustration – Peter Blake
 Design – Catherine Roylance
 Photography – Toru Moriyama

Commercial success

North America and Asia
When the album was officially announced, experts from the American Billboard magazine concluded Me and Mr. Johnson would sell more than 100,000 copies in its first week on the U.S. Billboard 200 album chart. As it turned out, the blues cover album sold 128,000 copies in its first week in the U.S., peaking at number six on the Billboard chart in 2004. The album reached the same position on the magazine's Top Internet Albums chart and topped the Billboard Blues albums chart for a total of eleven weeks and stayed 90 weeks on the chart. While charting on the Top 200 albums chart in its twelfth week, Me and Mr. Johnson became the week's greatest gainer with sales of 17,000 copies in July 2004. On 7 July the same year, the album was certified with a gold disc by the Recording Industry Association of America (RIAA) commemorating sales of 500,000 copies in the U.S. The album stayed a total of 18 weeks on the Billboard 200 albums chart. Overall in 2004, Me and Mr. Johnson was the 137th best-selling album as well as the 21st most-purchased album over the Internet and the best-selling blues album in the United States for this period. In 2005, the album was the 5th best-selling blues album in North America. In Canada, the album peaked at number three on the Canadian Albums Chart, compiled by the Billboard magazine and was later awarded a Gold presentation by the Canadian Recording Industry Association (CRIA), selling more than 50,000 copies in the country. However, the album went on to sale more than 60,000 units. In Japan, the album peaked at number eight on the Oricon albums chart in 2004 and went on to become the 84th best-selling album in Japan in 2004. It was also certified with a Gold disc in that region by the Recording Industry Association of Japan (RIAJ) for sales exceeding 100,000 copies and had sold more than 150,000 copies in the nation. In South Korea, the album sold about 2,500 copies and peaked at number seven on the Gaon albums chart for international releases. The album reached position 22 in the state of Hong Kong.

Africa, South America and Oceania
In South Africa, the album peaked at number three on the charts, compiled by the Recording Industry of South Africa (RiSA). Me and Mr. Johnson was also successful in South America, as it went to number nine on the Mexican albums chart and stayed a total of 32 weeks on the official albums chart compiled by Asociación Mexicana de Productores de Fonogramas y Videogramas (AMPROFON) for the nation. A little less successful was the release in Brazil, where the album only peaked at number 49 on the album charts and stayed just two weeks on the Associação Brasileira dos Produtores de Discos (ABPD) compilation. In Oceania, the album was slightly more successful as it peaked at number 23 on the ARIA charts in Australia, where it stayed three weeks on chart. For the year-ending of 2001, Me and Mr. Johnson was the 11th best-selling Jazz/Blues album in the country. In New Zealand however, the album was certified with a Platinum disc by the Recording Industry Association of New Zealand (RIANZ), exceeding sales figures of more than 15,000 copies in the country as Me and Mr. Johnson peaked at number 14 and stayed four weeks on chart.

Charts and certifications

Weekly charts

Year-end charts

Certifications

Sessions for Robert J

Sessions for Robert J is the sixteenth solo studio album by the British rock guitarist and singer-songwriter Eric Clapton and was released on 7 December 2004 through Reprise Records. The release is a companion project to his previously released album Me and Mr. Johnson. A DVD shows Clapton and his band traveling around the United Kingdom and United States just before and after his 2004 Crossroads Guitar Festival, recording some takes of Johnson's songs on video. Songs that were not included on the first album include: "From Four 'Til Late", "Terraplane Blues", "Ramblin' on my Mind", "Sweet Home Chicago", and "Stones in My Passway". Several songs are performed in duet by Clapton on steel-string acoustic guitar and Doyle Bramhall II on steel string acoustic and dobro guitars. Between sessions, Clapton discusses Johnson's profound influence on him and other musicians. One notable segment features Clapton performing in the 508 Park Avenue building in Dallas, Texas, that served as a makeshift studio in 1937 for Johnson to cut his legendary recordings.

Background
In his 2007 autobiography, Clapton wrote that he asked his long-time friend Hiroshi Fujiwara to direct a video which would accompany some tracks from his then-new studio release Me and Mr. Johnson for either TV or Internet broadcasting, (but not for commercials). Fujiwara agreed to work with Clapton on the project but also suggested that his friend Stephen Schible, the producer of the movie Lost in Translation, work with him and Clapton. When Schible got to the scene, he quickly decided to go beyond the idea of doing some short-form videos that Clapton had suggested and film a whole documentary about why Clapton loved Robert Johnson and how Johnson influenced him, as well as other musicians and the Blues in general. When Clapton agreed and finished filming for the video release, he was amazed by the recordings and consented to release them. With Sessions for Robert J, Clapton felt he had paid his dues to Robert Johnson.

Critical reception
Canadian music journalist Darryl Sterdan from Jam! magazine liked both the compact disc and DVD video release, noting that Clapton "picked up where he left off with last spring's Me and Mr. Johnson, covering more classics by Delta blues pioneer Robert Johnson in assorted settings". Sterdan awarded the release four out of five possible stars, especially enjoying the recordings from 508 Park Avenue, where several Blues icons had recorded their music more than 60 years ago. AllMusic critic Thom Jurek liked Sessions for Robert J and awarded the release three out of possible five stars. For his review for the AllMusic website, Jurek notes:

Chart performance

Sessions for Robert J was not very successful on the album charts, possibly due to its predecessor released earlier in Spring of 2004. However, the compact disc album peaked at number 74 on the official Austrian album charts where it stayed for one week on the chart in 2004. In France, the album reached number 120 on the album charts, compiled by the Syndicat National de l'Édition Phonographique and spent a total of six weeks on the chart, reaching even into the next year. In Japan, Sessions for Robert J sold about 6,000 units in its first week on the chart, peaking at number 189. By the end of 2011, however, the release sold 60,000 copies in the Asian country. In Canada, the album did not reach the music charts, but was a medium success, selling about 20,000 copies in the country. In the United Kingdom, the album also did not reach the official albums chart, however, it sold close to 25,000 copies. In the United States, both the album and the video release were most successful, reaching position 172 on the Billboard 200 albums chart, where the album stayed for two weeks. The release also topped the Billboard magazine's Blues albums chart, and spent a total of 49 weeks on the genre chart until 2006. The video DVD release reached number 21 on the American Top Music Video charts, also compiled by Billboard magazine. In the United States alone, the album sold more than 230,000 copies. In total, Sessions for Robert J has sold more than 400,000 copies worldwide. For the year-ending of 2005, Sessions for Robert J was the 3rd best-selling Blues album in the United States.

Track listings

References

2004 albums
2004 video albums
Eric Clapton albums
Eric Clapton video albums
Blues albums by English artists
Blues rock albums by English artists
Covers albums
Reprise Records albums
Tribute albums
Warner Records albums
Robert Johnson
Albums with cover art by Peter Blake (artist)
Albums produced by Simon Climie